Big Ugly Mouth is the second live spoken word album by Henry Rollins, released in 1987 on Quarterstick Records. It was reissued with his first spoken word album, Short Walk On A Long Pier (1985) and new artwork on 2.13.61 Records in 2005.  It was recorded at various tour dates in 1987 at Madison, WI, Chicago, IL, Minneapolis, MN, Denver, CO, Los Angeles, CA and New Brunswick, NJ.

Liner notes
Welcome to the re-issue of my first attempts at a talking record release. For the re-release of Big Ugly Mouth, I figured I would embarrass myself totally and include my first ever talking release Short Walk On a Long Pier. It was initially a cassette only release and it took all the money I had. Later, a short run was made on LP in Canada and then it went out of print. So here it is again, first time on CD. It's just awful. I figured if I put it in for free you couldn't get too mad about how wretched it is. As for Big Ugly Mouth, we sent it to engineer supreme Phil Klum to even out the levels of the tracks and clear it up some so it should sound better this time around. Enjoy...or something.

Thanks. Henry

Track listing
 "Peach" - 8:52
 "Boy On the Train" - 7:47
 "Dehumanized" - 5:28
 "Hiya Handsome" - 4:52
 "Short Story" - 7:19
 "Touch and Go" - 8:31
 "New Age Blues" - 4:48
 "First Class" - 6:43
 "Change" - 7:31
 "New York Story" - 5:45
 "Joe Cole Phone Sex God" - 3:09

Credits
Rae Di Leo - Engineer

References                 

1987 live albums
Henry Rollins live albums
Live spoken word albums
Live comedy albums
Spoken word albums by American artists
Quarterstick Records live albums